The helium trimer (or trihelium) is a weakly bound molecule consisting of three helium atoms. Van der Waals forces link the atoms together. The combination of three atoms is much more stable than the two-atom helium dimer. The three-atom combination of helium-4 atoms is an Efimov state. Helium-3 is predicted to form a trimer, although ground state dimers containing helium-3 are completely unstable.

Helium trimer molecules have been produced by expanding cold helium gas from a nozzle into a vacuum chamber. Such a set up also produces the helium dimer and other helium atom clusters. The existence of the molecule was proven by matter wave diffraction through a diffraction grating. Properties of the molecules can be discovered by Coulomb explosion imaging. In this process, a laser ionizes all three atoms simultaneously, which then fly away from each other due to electrostatic repulsion and are detected.

The helium trimer is large, being more than 100 Å, which is even larger than the helium dimer. The atoms are not arranged in an equilateral triangle, but instead form random shaped triangles.

Interatomic Coulombic decay can occur when one atom is ionised and excited.  It can transfer energy to another atom in the trimer, even though they are separated. However this is much more likely to occur when the atoms are close together, and so the interatomic distances measured by this vary with half full height from 3.3 to 12 Å. The predicted mean distance for Interatomic Coulombic decay in 4He3 is 10.4 Å. For 3He4He2 this distance is even larger at 20.5 Å.

References

Extra reading

Homonuclear triatomic molecules
Helium compounds
Van der Waals molecules
Allotropes